Prochilodus magdalenae is a tropical prochilodontid freshwater fish from Colombia. It is found in the Atrato, Sinú, Cauca and Magdalena Rivers. They have a growing role in fisheries.

References

Prochilodontidae
Endemic fauna of Colombia
Freshwater fish of Colombia
Magdalena River
Taxa named by Franz Steindachner
Fish described in 1879